Sarandi Sobral is a Uruguayan beach soccer player. He also practices futsal and footvolley, two disciplines where he played for the national team.

Career
Sarandi Sobral is nicknamed Pampero in homage to his father who was like the horse Paturuzú.

On 26 March 2011, Pampero and Vasco da Gama entered the history of beach soccer by defeating Sporting Portugal (4-2) in the final of the first club world cup. The Uruguayan was the best player in the competition.

In March 2012, for the Brazilian Cup, Pampero joined Botafogo.

External links
 Sarandi Sobral at playmakerstats.com (English version of ogol.com.br)

Sportspeople from Montevideo
1978 births
Living people
Uruguayan men's futsal players
Uruguayan beach soccer players
Uruguayan expatriate sportspeople in Brazil